The March 702 was a Formula 2 racing car and was built by March Engineering in 1970.

Development history and technology
The March 702 was the first-ever Formula 2 car built by March. The vehicle was based on the March 693 Formula 3 racing car from 1969. For Formula 2, the frame tubes were reinforced, which put the weight of the car at the upper limit. A Cosworth FVA engine was used as the drive. After a year of development work and building a lighter chassis, the car became competitive at the end of the season.

Racing history

Swiss Xavier Perrot achieved the 702's only win in 1970 at the Nürburgring. Perrot won the substitute race for the German Grand Prix, which was moved to Hockenheim, ahead of Hannelore Werner, who also drove a March 702. Werner's second place was the best finish ever achieved by a woman in a Formula 2 car.

References

Formula Two cars
1970s cars